Tadeusz Rut (11 October 1931 – 27 March 2002) was a Polish athlete. He competed at the 1956, 1960 and 1964 Olympics in the hammer throw and won a bronze medal in 1960. In 1956 he also finished 17th in the discus throw and was selected as the Olympic flag bearer for Poland. At the European championships he won a gold medal in 1958 setting a new continental record. That year he was ranked as the world's best hammer thrower.

Rut was born in a family of a carpenter in Przeworsk, and completed his school studies in Wroclaw in 1950. In 1966 he received a master's degree in sanitation engineering. During his athletics career Rut won 8 national titles in the hammer throw (1955–1958, 1961, 1964, 1965) and discus throw (1956) and set 18 national records.

References

1931 births
2002 deaths
Polish male discus throwers
Polish male hammer throwers
Olympic bronze medalists for Poland
Athletes (track and field) at the 1956 Summer Olympics
Athletes (track and field) at the 1960 Summer Olympics
Athletes (track and field) at the 1964 Summer Olympics
Olympic athletes of Poland
People from Przeworsk
People from Lwów Voivodeship
European Athletics Championships medalists
Legia Warsaw athletes
Śląsk Wrocław athletes
Sportspeople from Podkarpackie Voivodeship
Medalists at the 1960 Summer Olympics
Olympic bronze medalists in athletics (track and field)